Agelanthus igneus is a species of hemiparasitic plant in the family Loranthaceae, which is native to Mozambique and Tanzania.

Description 
A description of the plant is given in Govaerts et al., based on Polhill & Wiens (2006).

Habitat/ecology
A. igneus is found in riverine forest and coastal bushland.  Known hosts are Grewia and Combretum.

Threats 
In Tanzania the main threat is from agriculture and pine plantations, while in Mozambique the major threat is from tourism development.

References

Flora of Tanzania
Flora of Mozambique
igneus